Miracle Club de Bandrani is a football club from the Comoros based in Bandrani.

Achievements
Comoros Cup: 1
 2018

Performance in CAF competitions
CAF Confederation Cup: 1 appearance
2018–19 –

References

Football clubs in the Comoros